Hoban Dominican High School was one of seven all-female Catholic high school located in Cleveland, Ohio.  It was located in the Roman Catholic Diocese of Cleveland. The academic environment provided a 12 to 1 student to faculty ratio with an average of 23 students per class. 96% of Hoban Dominican students were Catholic and represented over 70 parishes.

Closing
Hoban Dominican was closed in 1971 by diocesan officials. Hoban Dominican's campus was sold to the Cleveland Metropolitan School District in 1973. The campus was then changed to Whitney M. Young Middle School in 1973. In 2007 it was renamed to Whitney M. Young School, then in 2009 Whitney M. Young High School. The original crosses that were on the building remain in place, except for the one on the school's chimney.  With the closing of Hoban Dominican High School, St. Joseph Academy and Erieview Catholic became the only area Catholic high school in the city of Cleveland dedicated to the education of young women.

References

Education in Cleveland
High schools in Cuyahoga County, Ohio
Defunct Catholic secondary schools in Ohio
Educational institutions established in 1951
Educational institutions disestablished in 1971
Roman Catholic Diocese of Cleveland
1951 establishments in Ohio
1971 disestablishments in Ohio
School buildings completed in 1951